Bojan Križaj (born 3 January 1957) is a Slovenian, back then Yugoslavian, former alpine skier.  During his international career he competed for the then-existing Yugoslavia. He competed at three Winter Olympics.

Career

Križaj, born in Kranj, was a member of a well known Tržič ski family so he started skiing at the age of 3. In the season 1976/77 he received the first World Cup point, qualified among the 15 best slalom runners and later during that season in Madonna di Campiglio he hit his first top 3 podium. On 20 January 1980 he achieved the first Yugoslav World Cup victory in Wengen, Switzerland and later he won seven more times, thus still being Yugoslavia's and Slovenia's most successful male alpine skier to date.

At 1980 Winter Olympics in Lake Placid, New York, U.S., he reached the fourth place in giant slalom, missing the bronze medal by only two hundredths of a second. Four years later he took the athlete's oath at the opening ceremony for Sarajevo's 1984 Winter Olympics. He caused a stir when he spoke the oath not in Croatian or Serbian but in Slovene. Despite great expectations of the Yugoslav audience he finished ninth in giant slalom, much less than expected. Križaj should also have competed at 1988 Winter Olympics in Calgary, Alberta, Canada, but he got injured a few days before the event.

His most successful World Championship was in 1982 in Schladming, Austria where he received the silver medal in slalom.

His most successful World Cup season was 1986/87 when he received the small crystal globe for the season's best slalom runner (that was the only men's crystal globe of that season not won by Pirmin Zurbriggen). Beside that he was the second in World Cup slalom standings in the  1979/80 and 1985/86 seasons and third in the 1980/81 season. His best position in overall World Cup standings was the 4th place in 1979/80.

He concluded his career in 1988 at the race in Saalbach, Austria where he stepped off the skis right at the end of the track and walked into the finish area. Since his skiing retirement he worked in many fields, including as importer of Austrian brand beer and adviser for ski products in Elan company. In March 2006 he became Head of Slovenian Ski Pool.

World Cup results

Season titles

Season standings

Race podiums
 8 wins (8 SL)
 33 podiums (26 SL, 7 GS)

Olympic Games results

World Championships results

From 1948 through 1980, the Winter Olympics were also the World Championships for alpine skiing.

References

External links
 
 

1957 births
Living people
Sportspeople from Kranj
Yugoslav male alpine skiers
Slovenian male alpine skiers
Olympic alpine skiers of Yugoslavia
Alpine skiers at the 1976 Winter Olympics
Alpine skiers at the 1980 Winter Olympics
Alpine skiers at the 1984 Winter Olympics
Slovenian businesspeople
FIS Alpine Ski World Cup champions
Oath takers at the Olympic Games